Cable Girls is a Spanish period drama streaming television series that ran from April 2017 and concluded in July 2020. Set in the late 1920s, it stars Ana Fernández, Nadia de Santiago, Blanca Suárez and Maggie Civantos. The first season, consisting of eight episodes, premiered on Netflix worldwide on 28 April 2017. The first half of the fifth and final season was released on Netflix on 14 February 2020.
The second half of the fifth and final season was released on Netflix on 3 July 2020.

Plot 
In 1928 a modern telecommunications company begins to operate in Madrid. The series tells of how the lives of four young women change after they start working for this company, which offers them decent pay and some independence. Each woman has a different reason for joining the company. Alba Romero, who goes by the name Lidia Aguilar to conceal her identity, seeks a job at the telecommunications company to complete a mission. Ángeles Vidal is a young mother who works to help provide for her family and is the most experienced switchboard operator at the telecommunications company. Carlota Senillosa wants a job at the telecommunications company to escape her controlling father and her rigid high society life, and Marga Suarez joins the company to start a new chapter of her life. The four women begin to form a close friendship, and together they navigate their sentimental  lives and their work. The show reveals the hardships that working women faced in 1920s Spain and especially the severe restrictions on the rights of Spanish women in a male-dominated society.

Production 
Cable Girls was the first Spanish original produced by Netflix, made in collaboration with Bambú Producciones. The idea for the series began with Ramon Campos and Gema R. Neira who worked together on the screen writing along with José Rustarazo, Jaime Vaca, Carlos Portela, Almudena Ocaña, Paula Fernández and Flora González Villanueva.

The series is filmed in Spain's capital, Madrid, in various locations across the city that had been given a makeover to transport viewers back to the 1920s. The most prominent locations in the series include La Plaza del Alamillo, where the protagonists live, with the Pension Dolores serving as their home, and the street Lope De Vega serving as their route to work. The series surrounds four women who work at a telecommunications company, a location in the show that required historical accuracy. The scenes in the National Telephone Company, where the women work, are filmed in the Fundacion Telefonica building on Grand Via.

The first season was released worldwide on 28 April 2017, and the second season was released on December 25 of the same year. The third season aired on 7 September 2018, and the fourth season was released on 9 August 2019. The fifth and final season of the series was released in two parts: Part 1 on 14 February 2020 and Part 2 on 3 July 2020.

Cast

Series overview

Episodes

Season 1 (2017)

Season 2 (2017)

Season 3 (2018)

Season 4 (2019)

Season 5 (2020)

Awards and nominations 

|-
| align = "center" rowspan = "2" | 2017 || 64th Ondas Awards || colspan = "2" | Best Fiction Web Series or Online Show ||  || align = "center" | 
|-
| 4th Fénix Awards || colspan = "2" | Best Drama Series ||  || 
|-
| align = "center" rowspan = "5" | 2018 || 5th Feroz Awards || Best Supporting Actress (TV) || Ana Polvorosa ||  || 
|-
| align = "center" | 27th Actors and Actresses Union Awards || Best Supporting Actress (TV) || Ana Polvorosa ||  || align = "center" | 
|-
| rowspan = "2" | 5th Platino Awards || colspan = "2" | Best Ibero-American Miniseries or TV Series ||  || rowspan = "2" | 
|-
| Best Actress in a Miniseries or TV Series || Blanca Suárez || 
|-
| 29th GLAAD Media Awards || colspan = "2" | Outstanding Scripted Television Series (Spanish-language) ||  || 
|}

References

External links
 
 

2017 Spanish television series debuts
2020 Spanish television series endings
2010s Spanish drama television series
2020s Spanish drama television series
Lesbian-related television shows
Spanish-language Netflix original programming
Television series set in the 1920s
Television series set in the 1930s
Television shows set in Madrid
Television shows filmed in Spain
Television series by Bambú Producciones